The 1962–63 Oberliga  was the eighteenth Oberliga season, the first tier of the football league system in West Germany. The league operated in five regional divisions, Berlin, North, South, Southwest and West. The five league champions and the runners-up from the west, south, southwest and north then entered the 1963 German football championship which was won by Borussia Dortmund. It was Borussia Dortmund's third national championship, having previously won it in 1956 and 1957.

It was the last season of the Oberliga as a tier one league as, following the 1962–63 season, the Bundesliga was introduced which the best Oberliga teams qualified for. Qualification for the new Bundesliga was determined by taking the previous ten seasons into account.

A similar league, the DDR-Oberliga, existed in East Germany, set at the first tier of the East German football league system. The 1962–63 DDR-Oberliga was won by SC Motor Jena.

Oberliga Nord
The 1962–63 season saw two new clubs in the league, VfB Lübeck and Arminia Hannover, both promoted from the Amateurliga. The league's top scorer was Dieter Meyer of Werder Bremen with 37 goals.

Oberliga Berlin
The 1962–63 season saw one new club in the league, SC Tegel, promoted from the Amateurliga Berlin. The league's top scorer was Hans-Joachim Altendorff of Hertha BSC with 41 goals, the highest total for any scorer in the five Oberligas in 1962–63.

Oberliga West
The 1962–63 season saw two new clubs in the league, Bayer 04 Leverkusen and Wuppertaler SV, both promoted from the 2. Oberliga West. The league's top scorer was Jürgen Schütz of Borussia Dortmund with 25 goals.

Oberliga Südwest
The 1962–63 season saw two new clubs in the league, SV Niederlahnstein and VfR Frankenthal, both promoted from the 2. Oberliga Südwest. The league's top scorer was Dieter Krafczyk of 1. FC Saarbrücken with 29 goals.

Oberliga Süd
The 1962–63 season saw two new clubs in the league, KSV Hessen Kassel and TSG Ulm 1846, both promoted from the 2. Oberliga Süd. The league's top scorers were Kurt Haseneder (1. FC Nürnberg), Rudolf Brunnenmeier (TSV 1860 München) and Rainer Ohlhauser (FC Bayern Munich), all three with 24 goals.

German championship

The 1963 German football championship was contested by the nine qualified Oberliga teams and won by Borussia Dortmund, defeating 1. FC Köln in the final. The runners-up of the Oberliga Nord and Süd played a pre-qualifying match. The remaining eight clubs then played a home-and-away round in two groups of four. The two group winners then advanced to the final.

Qualifying

|}

Group 1

Group 2

Final

|}

References

Sources
 30 Jahre Bundesliga  30th anniversary special, publisher: kicker Sportmagazin, published: 1993
 kicker-Almanach 1990  Yearbook of German football, publisher: kicker Sportmagazin, published: 1989, 
 DSFS Liga-Chronik seit 1945  publisher: DSFS, published: 2005
 100 Jahre Süddeutscher Fußball-Verband  100 Years of the Southern German Football Federation, publisher: SFV, published: 1997

External links
 The Oberligas on Fussballdaten.de 

1962-63
1
Ger